was a Japanese actor, voice actor, narrator and theatre director from Hakodate, Hokkaidō. He and his brother were two of seven children, and was a drop-out of the legal education division of Ritsumeikan University. He was connected to Theatre Echo, and was the older brother of actor and voice actor Rokurō Naya.

Naya is best known for providing the voice of Inspector Koichi Zenigata in the Lupin III franchise and for dubbing over the voices of actors Clark Gable, Charlton Heston, John Cleese, Lee Van Cleef, Martin Landau and Robert Ryan in the Japanese-language editions of their films. He died on 5 March 2013, at age 83, due to chronic respiratory failure.

Filmography

Television animation
Astro Boy (1963)
Big X (1964) — Dr. Marina
Ōgon Bat (1967) — Gem
Lupin III (1971) — Inspector Zenigata
Casshan (1973) (Narrator)
Space Battleship Yamato (1974) — Captain Juzo Okita
Lupin III Part II (1977) — Inspector Zenigata
Six God Combination Godmars (1981) — Emperor Zuul
Lupin III Part III (1984) — Inspector Zenigata
Lupin III: Goodbye Lady Liberty (1989) — Inspector Zenigata
Lupin III: Mystery of the Hemingway Papers! (1990) — Inspector Zenigata
Lupin III: Steal Napoleon's Dictionary! (1991) — Inspector Zenigata
Lupin III: From Russia With Love (1992) — Inspector Zenigata
Lupin III: Voyage to Danger (1993) — Inspector Zenigata
Lupin III: Dragon of Doom (1994) — Inspector Zenigata
Lupin III: The Pursuit of Harimao's Treasure (1995) — Inspector Zenigata
Lupin III: The Secret of Twilight Gemini (1996) — Inspector Zenigata
Lupin III: Island of Assassins (1997) — Inspector Zenigata
Lupin III: Crisis in Tokyo (1998) — Inspector Zenigata
Lupin III: The Columbus Files (1999) — Inspector Zenigata
Lupin III: Missed by a Dollar (2000) — Inspector Zenigata
Lupin III: Alcatraz Connection (2001) — Inspector Zenigata
One Piece (2001) — Crocus
Lupin III: Episode 0: First Contact (2002) — Inspector Zenigata
Lupin III: Operation: Return the Treasure (2003) — Inspector Zenigata
Lupin III: Stolen Lupin ~ The Copy Cat is a Midsummer's Butterfly~ (2004) — Inspector Zenigata
Monster (2004) — Blind Old Man
Lupin III: An Angel's Tactics – Fragments of a Dream Are the Scent of Murder (2005) — Inspector Zenigata
Lupin III: Seven Days Rhapsody (2006) — Inspector Zenigata
Lupin III: Elusiveness of the Fog (2007) — Inspector Zenigata
Lupin III: Sweet Lost Night ~Magic Lamp's Nightmare Premonition~ (2008) — Inspector Zenigata
Lupin the 3rd vs. Detective Conan (2009) — Inspector Zenigata
Lupin III: The Last Job (2010) — Inspector Zenigata

OVA
2001 Nights (1987) — Adam Robinson Jr.
Legend of the Galactic Heroes (1988) — Willibald Joachim von Merkatz
Locke the Superman (1989) — Great Jorg
Lupin III: Green Vs. Red (2008) — Inspector Zenigata
The Doraemons (1997) — Robot

Theatrical animation
Flying Phantom Ship (1969) — Ghost Captain
Ali Baba and the Forty Thieves (1971) — Goro
Lupin III: Mystery of Mamo (1978) — Inspector Zenigata
Lupin III: The Castle of Cagliostro (1979) — Inspector Zenigata
Crusher Joe (1983) — Captain Kowalski
Golgo 13 (1983) — Leonard Dawson
Nausicaä of the Valley of the Wind (1984) — Lord Yupa
Night on the Galactic Railroad (1985) - Dr. Bulganillo, Campanella's Father
Lupin III: Legend of the Gold of Babylon (1985) — Inspector Zenigata
Odin: Photon Sailer Starlight (1985) — "Bosun" Kuramoto
Dragon Ball: Curse of the Blood Rubies (1986) - Bongo
Lupin III: Farewell to Nostradamus (1995) — Inspector Zenigata
Lupin III: Dead or Alive (1996) — Inspector Zenigata
Noiseman Sound Insect (1997) — Prof. Franken

Tokusatsu
Kamen Rider (1971) — Great Leader of Shocker/Gel-Shocker
Ultraman Ace (1972) — Ultraman Ace
Jumborg Ace (1973) — Alien Emerald
Kamen Rider V3 (1973) — Great Leader of Destron
Kamen Rider Amazon (1974) — Narrator
Kamen Rider Stronger (1975) — Great Boss of Black Satan, Great Boss of Delza Army
Skyrider (1979) — Great Boss of Neo-Shocker
Kamen Rider Black RX (1988) — Emperor Crisis
Kamen Rider 555: Paradise Lost (2003) — One of the three wirepullers of Smart Brain (voice of Seizō Katō & Shōzō Iizuka)
Kamen Rider: The Next (2007) — Great Leader of Shocker
OOO, Den-O, All Riders: Let's Go Kamen Riders (2011) — Great Leader of Shocker/Gel-Shocker

Video games
EVE Burst Error (1997) — Genzaburo Suzuki
Xenoblade Chronicles (2010) — Otharon

Dubbing roles

Live-action
Charlton Heston
The Greatest Show on Earth (1970 TV Tokyo/1973 TBS edition) — Brad Braden
The Ten Commandments (1991 Fuji TV edition) — Moses
The Big Country — Steve Leech
Ben-Hur (1974 Fuji TV edition/1981 TV Asahi edition) — Judah Ben-Hur
55 Days at Peking — Major Matt Lewis
The Greatest Story Ever Told — John the Baptist
Planet of the Apes — George Taylor
Beneath the Planet of the Apes — Taylor
The Omega Man — Neville
Soylent Green — Detective Frank Thorn
The Three Musketeers — Cardinal Richelieu
The Four Musketeers — Cardinal Richelieu
Earthquake — Stewart Graff
Airport 1975 — Captain Alan Murdock
Two-Minute Warning (1980 NTV edition) — Captain Peter Holly
Midway — Captain Matthew Garth
Gray Lady Down — Captain Paul Blanchard
Solar Crisis (1992 NTV edition) — Admiral "Skeet" Kelso
True Lies — Director Spencer Trilby
In the Mouth of Madness — Jackson Harglow
Any Given Sunday (2002 NTV edition) — Commissioner
Town & Country (Mr. Claybourne)
Bowling for Columbine (2004 TV Tokyo edition)
John Wayne
Stagecoach (1975 NET edition) — Henry the Ringo Kid
3 Godfathers (1974 NET edition) — Robert Marmaduke Hightower
She Wore a Yellow Ribbon (1980 TV Asahi edition) — Captain Nathan Brittles
The Searchers (1973 and 1979 TV Asahi editions) — Ethan Edwards
Rio Bravo (1977 NET edition) — John T. Chance
The Horse Soldiers (1973 NET edition) – Colonel John Marlowe
True Grit (1985 TV Asahi edition) — Rooster Cogburn
Chisum — John Chisum
The Cowboys — Wil Andersen
Rooster Cogburn (1980 TV Asahi edition) — Rooster Cogburn
The Shootist (1987 TV Asahi edition) — John Bernard Books
Clark Gable
Boom Town — "Big John" McMasters
Mogambo — Victor Marswell
The Misfits — Gay Langland
Batman (1992 TBS edition) — Carl Grissom (Jack Palance)
Cold Creek Manor – Mr. Massie (Christopher Plummer)
Combat! — 2nd Lt. Gil Hanley (Rick Jason)
Death Ship (1983 Fuji TV edition) – Trevor Marshall (Richard Crenna)
The Empire Strikes Back — Obi-Wan Kenobi (Alec Guinness)
Escape from Absolum — The Father (Lance Henriksen)
For a Few Dollars More (1973 TV Asahi edition) — Colonel Douglas Mortimer (Lee Van Cleef)
Frankenstein vs. Baragon (Japanese version) — Dr. James Bowen (Nick Adams)
The Good, the Bad and the Ugly – Angel Eyes (Lee Van Cleef)
Inception (2012 TV Asahi edition) — Maurice Fischer (Pete Postlethwaite)
Invasion of Astro-Monster (Japanese version) — Glenn (Nick Adams)
The Majestic – Harry Trimble (Martin Landau)
Monty Python — John Cleese
Nineteen Eighty-Four — O'Brien (Richard Burton)
Rain Man — Dr. Gerald Bruner (Jerry Molen)
Return of the Jedi — Obi-Wan Kenobi (Alec Guinness)
Star Trek III: The Search for Spock (1988 NTV edition) — Sarek (Mark Lenard)
Star Wars Episode IV: A New Hope — Obi-Wan Kenobi (Alec Guinness)

Animation
The Rescuers – Mr. Chairman
The Rescuers Down Under – Chairmouse

Live-action roles
Prophecies of Nostradamus (1974) — Kazuo Ōta
Kamen Rider 555: Paradise Lost (2003) — Smart Brain Head

References

Sources

External links
 
Goro Naya at Theater Echo

1929 births
2013 deaths
20th-century Japanese male actors
21st-century Japanese male actors
Japanese male voice actors
Voice actors from Hakodate
Deaths from respiratory failure
Lupin the Third